Bobcat Pass is a mountain pass located in Taos County, New Mexico on the Enchanted Circle Scenic Byway.

Geography
At  in elevation, it is the highest mountain pass in New Mexico. It is located on NM 38 between Eagle Nest, New Mexico and Red River on the boundary of the Carson National Forest. The pass is the head of the Bobcat Creek, named for the frequency of the bobcat in the area.

Description
Wildlife in the area include elk, which may be seen about 6 in the evening. Cross-country skiing and snowshoeing are available at the summit of the pass.

Events
Events include:
 Moonlight Ski Tours on the Saturday before the full moon
 Just Desserts Eat & Ski in late February - dessert stands are set up along a ski route
 Christmas Luminaria Tour

References

Landforms of Taos County, New Mexico
Mountain passes of New Mexico
Transportation in Taos County, New Mexico